MediaOne Group, Inc. (Comcast MO Group, Inc.) was created by US WEST Inc, one of the original Baby Bells Regional Bell Operating Companies, acquisition of Boston-based Continental Cable and combined with its previously acquired Atlanta-based Wometco/GTC.  Wometco/GTC adopted the MediaOne name a year earlier. Media One Group was acquired in 2000 by AT&T Broadband, which was subsequently acquired by Comcast in 2002.

History
U S WEST Inc. was a regional holding company formed from the combination of three Bell Operating Companies: The Mountain States Telephone and Telegraph Company (or Mountain Bell, based in Denver, Colorado); Northwestern Bell, based in Omaha, Nebraska; and Pacific Northwest Bell, based in Seattle, Washington. U S WEST Inc. also operated BetaWest, U S WEST International, as well as a directory publishing company, LANDMARK Publishing, renamed US WEST Direct and finally U S WEST Dex. On January 1, 1991, Northwestern Bell and Pacific Northwest Bell were legally merged into Mountain Bell and renamed US WEST Communications, Inc. US WEST was the first RBOC to consolidate its Bell Operating Companies (followed by other was BellSouth).

Expansion into cable

In order to segregate its regulated telephone service from its unregulated cable TV businesses, US WEST Inc separated their assets and businesses into two groups named US WEST Communications Group and US WEST Media Group and issued separate tracking shares for each company.  These tracking shares reflected results and prospects of the group's business, and would be traded separately. The Media Group's ticker symbol was "UMG" while Communications group continued with the "USW" ticker.

In 1995, the cable modem service was later renamed to MediaOne Express. The company completed a co-branding deal with Time Warner's cable modem Internet business under which MediaOne would become MediaOne RoadRunner.

Acquisitions
In 1996, U S WEST acquired Continental Cablevision for $5.3 billion in stock and renamed it MediaOne (initially named Media1). Amos B. Hostetter, Jr., a founder and former chairman and CEO of Continental resigned after U S WEST moved the company's headquarters from Boston, Massachusetts.

In time the service also included pay-per-view, and a self-branded high-speed cable modem internet service named Hiway1 (Highway One). Hiway1 was an early provider of the cable modem technology. Most early-period modems for the service were created by the manufacturer LANcity (Bay Networks).

Name change
In 1998, US WEST Inc spun off its telephone and non-telephone assets into two separate companies. US WEST, Inc., later changing its name to MediaOne Group, Inc. and U S WEST Communications and U S WEST Dex divisions to a new entity incorporated in Delaware named US WEST, Inc. The "new" US WEST was then spun off to shareholders of Communications Group stock. The split became effective June 12, 1998. Chuck Lillis became CEO of MediaOne Group.

Acquisition by AT&T
In 1999, Comcast first made a bid for MediaOne. Comcast said they would pay $60 billion and assume all of MediaOne's debt. On May 6, 1999 AT&T, not wanting to be outdone promised about $62 billion instead, and paid a break up fee of $1.5 billion allowing MediaOne to be purchased by AT&T.

MediaOne RoadRunner et al. next became AT&T branded. The portion which ran television was "AT&T Cable Television", another part for Internet became known as "AT&T Broadband Internet" and the third became "AT&T Digital Phone". The buyout of MediaOne by AT&T happened close on the heels of AT&T's other cable company purchase TCI. That buyout by TCI already made AT&T the largest cable company, and MediaOne only served to increase their margin of leadership.

In the summer of 2000, AT&T Broadband purchased the cable television system serving the city of Boston, then controlled by New York-based Cablevision, for $1.1 billion in stock, cash and a trade of other cable systems. The deal effectively made the Boston/New England region MediaOne's largest clustered market. In exchange for the Boston system, Cablevision also received several of AT&T Broadband's systems which served suburban New York communities.

AT&T was unable to make the merger work for many reasons, and split the company into three separate companies: AT&T Corp. continued and retained its long distance business, AT&T Wireless Services was spun off as a public company, and AT&T Broadband was purchased by Comcast. At this point, MediaOne became known as Comcast MO Group, Inc.

Criticisms 
US WEST, as a telephone service provider, was accused by critics of failing to meet service needs within a reasonable time frame and of practicing predatory billing and collection methods.  While the company often claimed that subscriber demands were often greater than their ability to fulfill orders, many critics pointed to high profit margins, spending on bring-to-market technology and lackluster investment in customer support.

US WEST went through a period of union-management relations that bordered on positive during the early 1990s. After a failed re-engineering strategy, relations fell apart due to increasing hostility between company leaders and employees. When the company rolled out its new slogan – "Life's better here" – employees began wearing buttons and shirts that stated that "Life's Bitter Here".

The company was fined multiple times by the State of Oregon for these practices during the 1990s.   US WEST was also, at several times, involved in smaller litigation with other states within its service area for similar complaints from customers.

Qwest, MCI, and smaller competitive local exchange carriers (CLECs) who had recently been allowed to offer local service within US WEST's service area (as a result of the Telecommunications Act of 1996) complained to the Federal Communications Commission (FCC) that U S WEST was uncooperative in releasing their formerly owned lines to these new companies.  These types of complaints landed US WEST in court yet again, offering the complex question of whether or not the government could legally offer the sale of owned property to other companies in the event of deregulation.

In 1996, reports appearing in The Denver Post and the Rocky Mountain News revealed that CLECs had lodged complaints with the FCC against US WEST, including multiple complaints from Qwest Communications International, Inc. The complaints alleged US WEST neglected or seriously delayed release of "bundled loops" as required by the Telecommunications Act of 1996, making it difficult for competitors to provide local telephone service to their customers. Other competitors began following suit, and charged US WEST with monopoly-like or anti-trust type behavior.

Many customers criticized AT&T over the transitioning from Mediaone.net to attbroadband.com and subsequently attbi.com email addresses.  A final subsequent change from attbi.com to Comcast.net also drew further criticism from the company's longest customers who may have gone through the several prior email changes.

Markets
The main markets & regions for MediaOne were:
"MediaOne Atlanta"—Atlanta, Fayetteville (Georgia)
"MediaOne Chicago"—Chicago market (Illinois)
"MediaOne Denver"—Denver (Colorado) (Note: While MediaOne was at one point a very large employer in Denver, they never actually sold any services here despite this being the location of MediaOne Labs)
"MediaOne Florida"—Jacksonville, Miami (Southeast/Southwest Florida)
"MediaOne Midwest"—Metro Detroit/Ann Arbor, Erie Shore Region of Ohio (Toledo, Port Clinton, Fremont, Sandusky and Cleveland areas) (Michigan, Ohio)
"MediaOne Minnesota"—Twin Cities (Minnesota)
"MediaOne New England"—Boston (East/West Massachusetts, New Hampshire)
"MediaOne West"—Bakersfield, Fresno, Los Angeles, Mendota, Stockton (California)

Besides the United States, MediaOne Group also had several smaller business operations in headed by CEO Ron Timmons:
Belgium
Czech Republic
Hungary
India
Indonesia
Japan
Malaysia
The Netherlands
Poland
Russia
Singapore
Slovakia
United Kingdom

Almost all of MediaOne's international holdings were sold off to satisfy regulators for the merger with AT&T.

See also
 List of communities served by Comcast
 AT&T Broadband
 CenturyLink
 Qwest
 U S WEST

References

Further reading

External links
 MediaOne (archived company website from 1999)
 

Bell System
Comcast
Former AT&T subsidiaries
Companies based in Boston
Telecommunications companies established in 1983
Defunct companies based in Pennsylvania